Swynford (January 1907 – 18 May 1928) was a British Thoroughbred racehorse. Bred at the 16th Lord Derby's stud in Lincolnshire, England he was sired by John O'Gaunt, a son of Isinglass, winner of the British Triple Crown in 1893. His dam was Lord Derby's foundation mare and 1896 Epsom Oaks winner Canterbury Pilgrim who also produced Chaucer, the 1927 and 1933 Leading broodmare sire in Great Britain & Ireland.

Racing career
Lord Derby died in June 1908 and his son Edward took over the family's racing and breeding operations. Trained by George Lambton at the Stanley House Stables in Newmarket, Suffolk, Swynford was a difficult horse to handle and in his only start at age two ran unplaced. An injury kept him off the track until 1910 when he made his three-year-old debut in The Derby. He finished well back in the Derby after being struck in the leg by another runner. Following a third in the St. James's Palace Stakes at Ascot Racecourse, Swynford then won the first of two consecutive editions of Ascot's Hardwicke Stakes. The colt went on to win the Liverpool Summer Cup and the third leg of the British Triple Crown, the St. Leger Stakes, somewhat fortuitously since "half the racegoers in England declared... [the race] had been thrown away by Danny Meher on Lemberg"

Sent back to the track at age four, Swynford won the Chippenham Plate, Princess of Wales's Stakes, Eclipse Stakes and his second straight Hardwicke Stakes. In September 1911, he suffered a serious fetlock injury during training that almost ended his life. Saved by the work of a veterinarian, Swynford was retired to stud duty for Lord Derby where he would prove to be a very successful sire and a sire of leading sires.

Stud record
Swynford was the Leading sire in Great Britain and Ireland in 1923 and the Leading broodmare sire in Great Britain and Ireland in 1932, Sywnford's progeny included six British Classic race winners and in 1923 he was the Leading sire in Great Britain and Ireland.

Among the notable horses Swynford sired were:
 Bettina – (1918) – 1,000 Guineas Stakes (1921)
 Blandford (1919) – Three-time Leading sire in Great Britain and Ireland (1934, 1935, 1938). Sired four Epsom Derby winners including the 1935 British Triple Crown winner, Bahram
 Ferry (1915) – won 1,000 Guineas Stakes (1918)
 Hainault (br. 1914)
 Keysoe (br. 1916) – St. Leger Stakes (1919)
 Tranquil (1920) – won 1,000 Guineas Stakes (1923), St. Leger Stakes (1923)
 Sansovino (1921) – won Epsom Derby (1924)
 St Germans (1921) – Leading sire in North America (1931). Sired U.S. Racing Hall of Fame inductee, Twenty Grand, Kentucky Derby and Preakness Stakes winner and outstanding sire, Bold Venture, and the 1943 & 1944 American Champion Older Male Horse, Devil Diver
 Frilford (1922) Port Adelaide Cup and Tatt's SA Tattersall's Cup 
 Saucy Sue (1922) – won the 1,000 Guineas Stakes (1925), Epsom Oaks (1925) 
 Challenger II  (1927) – Leading sire in North America (1939). Sired U.S. Racing Hall of Fame inductees Challedon and Gallorette, plus the 1946 American Champion Three-Year-Old Filly, Bridal Flower.

Swynford was 21 years old when he died while at Woodlands Stud in Newmarket on 18 May 1928.

Pedigree

References

External links
 detailed racing and sire profile of Swynford at Thoroughbred Heritage
 Swynford at the National Horseracing Museum, Newmarket

1907 racehorse births
1928 racehorse deaths
British Champion Thoroughbred Sires
British Champion Thoroughbred broodmare sires
Racehorses bred in the United Kingdom
Racehorses trained in the United Kingdom
Thoroughbred family 1-g
Chefs-de-Race
St Leger winners